Bak An-sin (1369–1447) was a scholar-official of the Joseon Dynasty Korea in the 15th century.

He was also diplomat and ambassador, representing Joseon interests in a diplomatic mission to the Ashikaga shogunate in Japan.

1424 mission to Japan
King Sejong dispatched a diplomatic mission to Japan in 1424.  This embassy  to court of Ashikaga Yoshinori was led by Pak An-sin. The delegation from the Joseon court traveled to Kyoto in response to a message sent by the Japanese shogun;

The Japanese hosts may have construed these mission as tending to confirm a Japanocentric world order.  Pak An-sin and his delegation were more narrowly focused in negotiating protocols for Joseon-Japan diplomatic relations.

See also
 Joseon diplomacy
 Joseon missions to Japan
 Joseon tongsinsa

Notes

References

 Daehwan, Noh.  "The Eclectic Development of Neo-Confucianism and Statecraft from the 18th to the 19th Century," Korea Journal (Winter 2003).
 Kang, Etsuko Hae-jin . (1997). Diplomacy and Ideology in Japanese-Korean Relations: from the Fifteenth to the Eighteenth Century. Basingstoke, Hampshire; Macmillan. ;

External links
 Joseon Tongsinsa Cultural Exchange Association ; 

1369 births
1447 deaths
15th-century Korean people
Korean diplomats